Birgena was a town of ancient Phrygia, inhabited in Roman and Byzantine times. Its name does not occur in ancient authors, but is inferred from epigraphic and other evidence. 

Its site is tentatively located near  in Asiatic Turkey.

References

Populated places in Phrygia
Former populated places in Turkey
Roman towns and cities in Turkey
Populated places of the Byzantine Empire
History of Kütahya Province